Neoxeniades cincia is a butterfly in the family Hesperiidae. It is found in Pará, Brazil.

References

Butterflies described in 1867
Hesperiinae
Taxa named by William Chapman Hewitson
Hesperiidae of South America